This is a list of episodes from the show ReGenesis.

Series overview

Episodes

Season 1 (2004–05)

Season 2 (2006)

Season 3 (2007)

Season 4 (2008)

External links
 Episode synopses adapted from  regenesistv.com
 

Regenesis